Georgia State Route 15 Spur may refer to:

 Georgia State Route 15 Spur (Athens): a former spur route of State Route 15 that existed in Athens
 Georgia State Route 15 Spur (Baldwin): a former spur route of State Route 15 that existed in Baldwin
 Georgia State Route 15 Spur (Cornelia): a former spur route of State Route 15 that existed in Cornelia
 Georgia State Route 15 Spur (Jackson–Banks County): a former spur route of State Route 15 that existed in Jackson and Banks counties
 Georgia State Route 15 Spur (Tallulah Falls): a former spur route of State Route 15 that existed in Tallulah Falls

015 Spur